Factor T is a book first published in 1956 written by the Polish writer, philosopher, filmmaker, composer and poet Stefan Themerson. It was originally written as a letter to Bertrand Russell.

Factor T is based upon Themerson's theory that the eternal tragedy (factor T) of humanity is found in the conflict between the urge to satisfy certain desires and the aversion against the actions required for such a satisfaction.

References

1956 non-fiction books
Polish non-fiction books